Glyndon is a city in Clay County, Minnesota, United States. The population was 1,306 as of the 2020 census.

History
Glyndon was platted in 1872 when the railroad was extended to that point. A post office has been in operation in Glyndon since 1872.

Notable people
 Arthur L. Peterson, politician and educator, was born in Glyndon.
 Cal Larson, politician and businessman, was born in Glyndon.

Geography
The city was named after Howard Glyndon, the pen name of poet Laura C. Redden Searing.

U.S. Route 10 serves as a main route in the city.

Demographics

2010 census
As of the census of 2010, there were 1,394 people, 464 households, and 360 families living in the city. The racial makeup of the city was 92.3% White, 1.2% African American, 2.8% Native American, 1.9% from other races, and 1.8% from two or more races. Hispanic or Latino of any race were 6.0% of the population.

There were 464 households, of which 50.9% had children under the age of 18 living with them, 65.5% were married couples living together, 6.7% had a female householder with no husband present, 5.4% had a male householder with no wife present, and 22.4% were non-families. 18.5% of all households were made up of individuals, and 5.1% had someone living alone who was 65 years of age or older. The average household size was 3.00 and the average family size was 3.45.

The median age in the city was 29.5 years. 35.4% of residents were under the age of 18; 6.9% were between the ages of 18 and 24; 32.4% were from 25 to 44; 18.2% were from 45 to 64; and 6.9% were 65 years of age or older. The gender makeup of the city was 50.9% male and 49.1% female.

2000 census
As of the census of 2000, there were 1,049 people, 359 households, and 283 families living in the city. The racial makeup of the city was 95.71% White, 0.10% African American, 0.29% Native American, 0.10% Asian, 1.91% from other races, and 1.91% from two or more races. Hispanic or Latino of any race were 7.53% of the population.

There were 359 households, out of which 44.6% had children under the age of 18 living with them, 65.2% were married couples living together, 10.3% had a female householder with no husband present, and 20.9% were non-families. 18.7% of all households were made up of individuals, and 4.7% had someone living alone who was 65 years of age or older. The average household size was 2.92 and the average family size was 3.33.

In the city, the population was spread out, with 34.2% under the age of 18, 8.0% from 18 to 24, 31.0% from 25 to 44, 19.4% from 45 to 64, and 7.4% who were 65 years of age or older. The median age was 30 years. For every 100 females, there were 102.1 males. For every 100 females age 18 and over, there were 96.6 males.

The median income for a household in the city was $44,028, and the median income for a family was $50,000. Males had a median income of $35,259 versus $22,303 for females. The per capita income for the city was $17,922. About 7.3% of families and 9.7% of the population were below the poverty line, including 12.8% of those under age 18 and 5.1% of those age 65 or over.

References

Cities in Minnesota
Cities in Clay County, Minnesota